Lara Dunkley (born 31 May 1995) is an Australian netball player in the Suncorp Super Netball league, playing for the Queensland Firebirds.

Dunkley began her elite netball career with the Melbourne Vixens in the mid 2010s, playing for the club's reserves team the Victorian Fury in the Australian Netball League (ANL), where she captained the team in the 2018 season. She was elevated to the Vixens' senior list for the 2019 Suncorp Super Netball season, replacing the long-term injured Tayla Honey.

After leaving the Vixens, Dunkley was signed as a temporary replacement player for the 2020 Suncorp Super Netball season by the Queensland Firebirds.

Dunkley grew up in the regional Victorian town of Yarram and is the sibling of Western Bulldogs premiership footballer Josh Dunkley. Off the court Dunkley has completed a Bachelor of Education where she works as a substitute teacher and netball coach at various schools and netball organisations.

References

External links
 Suncorp Super Netball profile
 Melbourne Vixens profile

Australian netball players
Melbourne Vixens players
1995 births
Living people
Victorian Netball League players
Australian Netball League players
Suncorp Super Netball players
Queensland Firebirds players
Victorian Fury players
Netball players from Victoria (Australia)